Esa aka El Presidente, born Francesco Cellamaro (Reggio Calabria, 1 October 1972), is an Italian rapper and beatmaker of Calabrian origins. l Presidente has been active since the early stages of the Italian hip hop movement in the early 1990s, and predominantly discusses Politics and Society in his music.

Biography 

He is the brother of Tormento (in group Sottotono) and Marya, both became rappers. Francesco grew up musically listening to groups such as Eric B & Rakim, Run-DMC, Public Enemy and the Beastie Boys. In his teens he starts to attend hip hop circles, first as a breaker, and later approaching MCing.

In 1991 the collective Otierre (Originale Trasmissione del Ritmo) is founded, union of breakers, beatmakers, DJs and MCs, or representatives of each of the four core disciplines of hip hop. The roster consists of Azza, DJ Fede, DJ Irmu, DJ Nitro, DJ Vez, DJ Vigor, Esa, Intruso, Limite, Polare, Torrido, and later by The Female Mc La Pina.

In 1998 Esa and Polare change their names respectively to El Presidente and Polaroide founding the group Gente Guasta.

In 2002 he starts his first solo project Tutti Gli Uomini Del Presidente, self-produced and distributed by Vibrarecords.

In 2006 he released his second solo album Tu sei bravo on the label La Serra.

In 2008 he founded 'Siamesi Brothers' hence the name with his brother Tormento and released a self-titled LP.

Discography

With Otierre (OTR)
1992 - l'anno della riscossa (demo) (1992)
Ragga no droga (1992)
Quel sapore particolare (1994)
Dalla sede (1997)

With Gente Guasta
La grande truffa del rap (2000)
Quinto potere (2001)

With Siamesi Brothers
Siamesi Brothers (2008)
La macchina del funk (2010)

Solo
 2002 – Tutti gli uomini del presidente
 2006 – Tu sei bravo
 2007 – Non mi spezzo
 2008 – Il messaggio
 2008 – KI.N.G. - Kids Never Grow Up
 2009 – Hip Hop Musica
 2011 – 100% di getto

Other collaborations
Esa & Virtu-oso – Special Blend (2009/2010)

Other productions
La Connessione - European Attack (1998)
Street album (2004)
Robe Grosse – Fish (2005)
The Reverse-the reverse (2005)
The Stuff(it's really fresh)-The Reverse (2005)

References

External links
Myspace
FunkyYaMama
Doppia H containing Esa's discography

1973 births
Living people
Italian rappers
People of Calabrian descent
Musicians from Varese